Croydon North West was a borough constituency represented in the House of Commons of the Parliament of the United Kingdom. It elected one Member of Parliament (MP) by the first past the post system of election.

Politics and history of the constituency 
The Croydon North West constituency was created for the 1955 general election, just five years after a previous re-organisation of the three seats in the County Borough of Croydon.

It took in areas of the former Croydon North and Croydon West constituencies and bordered Croydon North East and Croydon South, as well as, when originally created, the constituencies of Streatham, Norwood, Beckenham and Mitcham.

The constituency was abolished at the 1997 general election and was entirely subsumed within the new Croydon North, with the addition of the Thornton Heath, Upper Norwood and South Norwood wards.

For almost all of its history, Croydon North West had Conservative Members of Parliament. It was the scene of a famous by-election in 1981, following the death of its MP, won by Bill Pitt for the SDP-Liberal Alliance. However, it returned to the Conservatives two years later, remaining so until it was snatched by Malcolm Wicks for the Labour Party at the 1992 general election.

Boundaries 
1955–1974: The County Borough of Croydon wards of Bensham Manor, Norbury, Upper Norwood, West Thornton, and Whitehorse Manor.

1974–1983: The same wards in the London Borough of Croydon.

1983–1997: Wards of the above borough: Bensham Manor, Beulah, Broad Green, Norbury, West Thornton, and Whitehorse Manor.

When first created, Croydon North West included the areas of Norbury, Upper Norwood and parts of west Croydon and Thornton Heath. It saw various boundary changes, largely stretching further south and losing its more easterly parts. At the time of its abolition in 1997, Croydon North West covered all of West Croydon, Selhurst, Norbury and parts of Thornton Heath around the Thornton Heath Pond, within the London Borough of Croydon.

Members of Parliament

Elections

Elections in the 1950s

Elections in the 1960s

Elections in the 1970s

Elections in the 1980s

Elections in the 1990s

See also
List of parliamentary constituencies in London

References

Sources 

Politics of the London Borough of Croydon
Parliamentary constituencies in London (historic)